Future Generations: Small People was a charity programme for Children in Need, put together by the BBC in 1998 as a sequel of sorts to the great success of the previous year's Perfect Day charity single.

The programme was dedicated to the BBC's vast output of children's programmes and featured five-year-old Scott Chisholm, dressed in 1950s-style school uniform, walking round various children's programmes past and present, sometimes interacting with the characters. It was first shown on 1 December 1998, within the Children in Need charity programme.

The promotion was not meant to be like Perfect Day, but instead reminding the viewers of what their license fee was paying for. The following year, a similar promotion was created entitled Shaggy Dog Story. This promotion featured a collection of BBC comedians and was used to represent the diverse range of comedic output.

Characters
The programmes and characters that were included were, in order of appearance:

Bill and Ben (with Little Weed)
Muffin the Mule
Picture Book (Sausage the Dog)
Andy Pandy (with Teddy)
The Woodentops (Jenny Woodentop, Willy Woodentop and Spotty Dog)
Camberwick Green (Windy Miller, Mrs Honeyman and Mr Thomas Tripp)
Trumpton (The Mayor, Mr. Clamp, Mrs Cobbit, Miss Lovelace (with Mitzi, Daphne and Lulu), Police Constable Potter, Captain Flack, Fireman Pugh, Fireman Pugh, Fireman Barney McGrew, Fireman Cuthbert, Fireman Dibble and Fireman Grubb)
Chigley (Lord Bellborough, Mr Brackett, Bessie, Mr Swallow and Mr S. Rumpling)
The Magic Roundabout (Florence, Dougal, The Train, Ermintrude, Brian and Zebedee)
Noddy (with Big Ears and Mr Plod)
Pingu
Morph
The Herbs (Parsley the Lion and Dill the Dog)
Postman Pat (with Jess)
Bagpuss (in archive footage, with the mice)
Willo the Wisp (Mavis the fairy)
Dennis the Menace and Gnasher
Spider
Crystal Tipps and Alistair
Mary, Mungo and Midge
Roobarb and Custard (with the birds)
Mr Benn (with the Shopkeeper)
Doctor Who (the TARDIS and the Daleks)
Blue Peter (John Noakes, Valerie Singleton, Peter Purves and Lulu the elephant)
Newsround (John Craven)
Play School (Derek Griffiths)
The Lion, the Witch and the Wardrobe
The Borrowers
The Really Wild Show (Michaela Strachan and a Bengal tiger cub)
Teletubbies (Tinky Winky, Dispy, Laa-Laa and Po)
Live and Kicking (Zoë Ball)

References 
 BBC News article on the trailer
 TVARK Promotions page including the Future Generations Promo (Titled Small People on site)

External links
 BBC News article on the trailer

BBC Television shows